Balko is an unincorporated community in Beaver County, Oklahoma, United States.  The post office was established March 14, 1904. The population is 623. 

Balko has a school, gas station, diner, tire shop, three churches and post office. The local economy is dependent on farming, ranching, and the oil industry. The local school is a K-12 public school.

Geography
Balko is located in the Oklahoma Panhandle, along U.S. Route 412, east of U.S. Route 83 and west of U.S. Route 270.
 
The nearest airport is Beaver Municipal, about 21 miles northeast.  The nearest commercial airport is Liberal Mid-America Regional in Kansas, about 42 miles north-northwest.

Climate

References

Unincorporated communities in Beaver County, Oklahoma
Unincorporated communities in Oklahoma
Oklahoma Panhandle